Michael Del Bane (February 24, 1918 – November 8, 1984) was a Democratic member of the Ohio House of Representatives and chairman of the Public Utilities Commission. Del Bane was awarded the Phillips Medal of Public Service in 1980. He died of cancer at the age of 66.

References

Members of the Ohio House of Representatives
1918 births
1984 deaths
20th-century American politicians
People from Hubbard, Ohio
Deaths from cancer in Ohio